Agni Devi is a 2019 Tamil-language thriller film. The film is directed by John Paul Raj and Sham Surya, and stars Bobby Simha, Madhoo and Ramya Nambeesan. Produced by JPR and Stalin under Jai Film Productions and Seatoa Studios, the film underwent production trouble and released on 22 March 2019.

Plot

Agni Dev IPS (Bobby Simha), a devoted cop, has taken charge of investigating the brutal murder of a journalist which happened in broad light. As the case progresses, Agni is asked by his senior, Charles (Bose Venkat), to stop from proceeding further with the investigation. He realises that Charles has been intimidated by Shakuntala Devi (Madhoo), a dreaded politician by abusive circumstances who was later revealed to be his mother he lost when he was four. How Agni tackles her and nabs the culprit forms the rest of the story.

Cast 
 Bobby Simha as Agni Dev IPS
 Madhoo as Shakuntala Devi
 Ramya Nambeesan as Deepa
 Sathish as Sathyamoorthy IPS
 Livingston as Agni's foster father
 Bose Venkat as Charles, Commissioner of Police
 M. S. Bhaskar as Manimaran, Politician
 Delhi Ganesh as Constable
 Sanjeev as Deepak
 Manohar

Marketing 
In January 2019, the name was changed to Agni Devi.

Controversy 
Three days before the release of the film, the lead actor Bobby Simha filed a complaint at Nandambakkam police station against director John Paulraj.  In his complaint, Simha said that he had only acted in the film for five days and had opted out of the film after the director had shot scenes which were not in sync with the script narrated to the actor. Simha also mentioned that most of the scenes in the film featuring him were shot with body double and VFX.

Despite the report, the film had a theatrical release across Tamil Nadu. Simha later added that he sensed the team was unprofessional by the fourth day of shoot as the director had veered away from the agreed decision to base the plot on a novel written by Rajeshkumar. Furthermore, Simha was unhappy with the sudden involvement of a co-director named Sham Surya, who was also given directorial credits for the project. Despite a request from the Nadigar Sangam to settle the issue amicably, Simha refused to co-operate and announced his intentions of seeking judicial action. Lamenting the inactivity of the professional association, Simha highlighted that the Nadigar Sangam had failed to assist him during previous disagreements about the films, Chennai Ungalai Anbudan Varaverkirathu (2015) and Meera Jaakirathai (2016).

References

External links 
 

2019 films
2010s Tamil-language films
2019 thriller films
2010s political thriller films
Indian political thriller films